Sparrow Hills or Vorobyovy Gory is a residential complex in Moscow. The complex located at the base of Sparrow Hills and comprises seven buildings. 1,039 apartments are located in that complex, that was completed in 2004. As of 2007, its building 2 is the 4th tallest building in Moscow and the 3rd tallest residential building in Europe, with the tallest being a fellow Muscovite, the Triumph-Palace. The complex' address is Mosfil'movskaya ulitsa, 70. Tower Four is

See also
List of skyscrapers in Europe
List of tallest buildings in Moscow

References

External links
SkyscraperPage: Sparrow Hills

.

Residential buildings completed in 2004
Residential skyscrapers in Moscow